Colorful Character may refer to:

 13 Colorful Character (2012), the 13th album by the Japanese girl group Morning Musume
 The Colorful Character, a short story by L. Sprague de Camp